The 2014–15 Georgia State Panthers women's basketball team represented Georgia State University in the 2014–15 NCAA Division I women's basketball season. The Panthers, coached by Sharon Baldwin-Tener, were a member of the Sun Belt Conference, and played their home games on campus at the GSU Sports Arena.

2014–15 Roster

2014–15 Schedule

|-
!colspan=9 style="background:#273BE2; color:#FFFFFF;"| Exhibition

|-
!colspan=9 style="background:#273BE2; color:#FFFFFF;"| Regular Season

|-
!colspan=9| 2014 Sun Belt Tournament

References

Georgia State
Georgia State Panthers women's basketball seasons